Boo is a given name, nickname and surname. It may refer to:

People with the surname
 Ben Boo (born 1925), American politician
 Bertil Boo (1914–1996), Swedish singer
 Boo Cheng Hau (born 1964), Malaysian politician
 Boo Junfeng (born 1983), Singaporean filmmaker
 Boo Seung-kwan (born 1998), South Korean member and main vocalist of boy group Seventeen
 Boo Soon-hee (born 1967), South Korean sport shooter
 Jim Boo (born 1954), American ice hockey player
 Karl Boo (1918–1996), Swedish politician
 Katherine Boo (born 1964), American journalist and MacArthur Fellow
 Kurt Boo, Swedish sprint canoer who competed in the late 1930s
 Prince Lee Boo (1764–1784), visitor to London from the Pelew Islands (now Palau)
 Sigrid Boo (1898–1953), Norwegian author

People with the given name
 Boo Cook (born 1972), British comics artist
 Boo Kullberg (1889–1962), Swedish gymnast, member of the gold medal 1912 Olympics team
 Boo Saville (born 1980), British contemporary artist

People with the nickname or stage name
 Boo Bradley (1972–2016), a stage name of American professional wrestler Jonathan Rechner also known as Balls Mahoney
 Boo Ellis (1936–2010), American National Basketball Association player
 Boo Harvey (born 1966), American former college basketball player
 Boo Hewerdine (born 1961), British singer-songwriter
 Ronald "Boo" Hinkson, Saint Lucian jazz guitarist, co-founder of the Tru Tones in the 1960s
 Boo Jackson (born 1981), American retired basketball player
 Curley "Boo" Johnson (born 1965), former member of the Harlem Globetrotters
 Boo McLee (born 1983), American football player
 Boo Morcom (1921–2012), American track and field athlete, particularly in the pole vault
 Boo Robinson (born 1987), American professional football defensive tackle
 Boo Weekley (born 1973), American golfer
 Boo Williams (born 1979), American retired National Football League wide receiver

See also 
 
 
 Boo (disambiguation)

Lists of people by nickname